Armchair may refer to:

 Armchair (furniture), a chair with arm rests
 Armchair (band), a Thai pop rock band
 Armchair (bus company), in London
 Armchair nanotube, a carbon nanotube with chiral symmetry
 "Armchair", a song by Avail from their 1996 album 4am Friday
 "Armchairs", a song by Andrew Bird from his 2007 album Armchair Apocrypha

See also 
 The Armchair, a 2009 Burkinabé film directed by Missa Hebié